Sticky platelet syndrome is a term used by some  to describe a disorder of platelet function. It was first described by Mammen in 1983. It is inherited in an autosomal dominant pattern. It has not been associated with a specific gene, and it is not recognized as an entity in OMIM.

Among researchers using the term, it has been described as a coagulation disorder that can present in conjunction with protein S deficiency and Factor V Leiden. It is not currently known if sticky platelet syndrome is a distinct condition, or if it represents part of the presentation of a more well characterized coagulation disorder.

Signs and symptoms

Cause

The syndrome is believed to be hereditary.

Diagnosis
SPS is diagnosed by demonstrating platelet hyperaggregability.  In a lab test called aggregometry, platelet stickiness is stimulated with epinephrine (EPI) and/or adenosine diphosphate (ADP).  This test is not possible for patients being treated with acetylsalicylic acid until that substance has sufficiently cleared from their system.

Treatment
Those diagnosed are usually treated with taking a low dose (80–100 mg) Aspirin a day.  Anticoagulants (e.g. Warfarin, Coumadin) or clopidogrel (Plavix) are often additionally prescribed following formation of a medically significant clot. Thrombelastography is more commonly being used to diagnose hypercoagulability and monitor anti-platelet therapy.

See also
 Thrombophilia

References

Coagulopathies
Syndromes affecting blood